Fayetteville Area System of Transit (FAST) is the public transit system for Fayetteville, North Carolina.

FAST was created in 1976, when the City of Fayetteville took over  private transportation system operated by the Cape Fear Transit Bus Company. That system provided services to the current service area and Little Rockfish in Hope Mills. The hours of operation were seven days a week, from 5:30 a.m. to midnight. It had a fleet size of 29 buses and 20 bus operators.

FAST serves 5,000 daily passengers, with 18 daily bus routes operated from 5:30 a.m. to 10:30 p.m., Monday through Friday, and from 7:30 a.m. to 10:30 p.m. on Saturday. In fiscal year 2014, FAST carried just under 1.6 million passenger trips.

Routes

References

External links
 Fayetteville Area System of Transit

Transportation in Fayetteville, North Carolina
Bus transportation in North Carolina